The Poatina Power Station is a conventional hydroelectric power station located in the Central Highlands region of Tasmania, Australia. The power station is situated on the Great Lake and South Esk and is owned and operated by Hydro Tasmania.

Technical details
Located in the Great Lake and South Esk catchment area, Poatina makes use of a  descent from the Great Western Tiers to the Norfolk Plains in Tasmania's northern Midlands. Water from Great Lake is diverted via a tunnel to the edge of the Great Western Tiers where it plummets down a viable penstock line, which enters the ground again near the power station. The Poatina Power Station is located  underground in a massive artificial cavern hence the name Poatina, Palawa for "cavern" or "cave". The headrace tunnel and penstocks were bored through mudstone with the aid of a Robbins Mole.

Poatina was commissioned in 1964, and replaced the Waddamana and Shannon power stations. The small construction village of  Poatina sits perched on top of a low plateau,  from the stations subterranean location.

The station output, estimated at  annually, is fed to TasNetworks' transmission grid via underground circuit breakers to two 16 kV/110 kV and four 16 kV/220 kV generator transformers located in the switchyard above.

2016 Tasmanian energy crisis
The Poatina output in early 2016 had dropped to one-fifth of capacity due to ongoing water shortage in Tasmania's hydro system.

See also

 List of power stations in Tasmania

References

External links
Hydro Tasmania page on Great Lake-South Esk scheme

Energy infrastructure completed in 1964
Hydroelectric power stations in Tasmania
Central Highlands (Tasmania)
Energy crisis, 2016